The canton of St. Gallen or St Gall is a canton of Switzerland. The capital is St. Gallen.

It was formed in 1803 as a conflation of the city of St. Gallen, the territories of the Abbey of St. Gall and various former subject territories of the Old Swiss Confederacy.

History

The canton of St. Gallen is an artificial construct of various historical territories, defined by Napoleon Bonaparte in the Act of Mediation in 1803.
About half of the canton's area corresponds to the acquisitions of the abbey of St. Gallen over centuries.

The city of St. Gallen became independent of the abbey in 1405. At the same time, the abbey lost control of Appenzell. Conversely, the Toggenburg was acquired by the Abbey in 1468.

Both the city and the abbey were associates (Zugewandte Orte) of the Old Swiss Confederacy, but unlike Appenzell never joined as full members.

The territories at Lake Zürich, Walensee and Rheintal remained independent until 1798. In the Helvetic Republic, the northern parts of the modern canton together with Appenzell became the canton of Säntis, while its southern parts together with Glarus became the canton of Linth.

Before the 1798 French invasion,
the territory of the modern canton consisted of the free city of St. Gallen, the territories of the Abbey of St. Gallen (including Fürstenland and Toggenburg), the free city of Rapperswil, Pfäfers Abbey, Sargans and the independent lordships (bailiwicks) of Rheintal, Sax-Forstegg, Hohensax, Werdenberg, Windegg and Uznach.

In April 1798, the territories of the later canton of St. Gallen 
were divided between the cantons of Säntis and Linth of the Helvetic Republic (along with Appenzell, Glarus and parts of Schwyz.

However, the two new Cantons had immediate financial problems and were forced to institute a number of unpopular taxes and laws. The Abbey was secularized on 17 September 1798 and the Prince-Abbot Pankraz Vorster fled to Vienna. The unpopular laws and the closing of the Abbey caused unrest throughout the area. When the War of the Second Coalition broke out in 1799, an Austrian army marched into eastern Switzerland and returned the Prince-Abbot to his throne at the Abbey. However, his victory was short-lived. The Austrian and Russian armies were defeated outside Zürich and the French Army returned to St. Gallen driving the Prince-Abbot out.

In 1803, as part of the Act of Mediation, the area joined the Swiss Confederation as the Canton of St. Gallen.

The cantonal constitution of 1803 was revised in 1814. Because of the confessional heterogeneity of the canton's population, the 1814 constitution did unusually organise matters of religion, marriage and education not on a cantonal level but introduced a twofold division (confessional dualism), with separate Protestant and a Catholic assemblies subordinate to the legislative cantonal assembly (Grosser Rat).

The constitution was revised again in 1831, introducing elements of direct democracy. The constitution of 1831 divided the canton into 15 districts (Bezirke), 
reduced to 14 in 1918 (fusion of Tablat district with St. Gallen district).

Due to continuing confessional squabbles over the organisation of schools, the canton eventually placed education under its authority in 1861.

The constitution was yet again revised in 1890, with a stronger emphasis on direct democracy.

The 1890 constitution remained in effect, with numerous later changes, until 2001, the date of the latest revision of the cantonal constitution.

In the 2001 constitution, the division into districts was replaced by a division into eight constituencies (Wahlkreise), effective on 1 January 2003.

Geography

 
The canton is located in the north east of Switzerland. It is bounded to the north by Lake Constance (Bodensee). To the east lies the Rhine valley. Over the Rhine are Austria (state of Vorarlberg) and Liechtenstein. To the south, the canton of St. Gallen is bounded by the cantons of Graubünden, Glarus and Schwyz. To the west lie the cantons of Zürich and Thurgau.

The two half cantons Appenzell Innerrhoden and Appenzell Ausserrhoden are completely surrounded by lands of the canton of St. Gallen.

The main rivers of the canton are the Rhine, Thur, Linth and Seez. The topography changes from the plains, near river Rhine and Lake Constance, towards the mountainous areas of the Alps in the south (Appenzell Alps and Glarus Alps). Of the rest of the canton,  is considered unproductive while  is filled with housing or roads.

The canton includes portions of the lake of Constance, of the Walensee (rather over ), and of the lake of Zürich, and several small lakes wholly within its limits.

The mountains of the canton include part of a thrust fault that was declared a geologic UNESCO World Heritage Site, under the name Swiss Tectonic Arena Sardona, in 2008.

Political subdivisions

Constituencies

Since 2003 the canton is subdivided into 8 constituencies (Wahlkreise) replacing the districts (Bezirke). 
Rheintal with capital Altstätten
Rorschach with capital Rorschach
Sarganserland with capital Sargans
See-Gaster with capital Rapperswil-Jona
St. Gallen with capital St. Gallen
Toggenburg with capital Lichtensteig
Werdenberg with capital Buchs
Wil with capital Wil

Municipalities

There are 77 municipalities in the canton.

Politics

Federal election results

 FDP before 2009, FDP.The Liberals after 2009
 "*" indicates that the party was not on the ballot in this canton.
 Part of the GPS

Demographics

88% of the population is German-speaking. 
The main centres of population are the capital St. Gallen (69,700 inhabitants), Rapperswil-Jona (27,000), Wil (17,500) and Gossau (17,000). 
 , the population included 97,461 foreigners, or about 20.9% of the total population. 
The majority of the population is Roman Catholic (52%) while a large minority is Protestant (28%).

Historical population 
The historical population is given in the following table:

Economy
Agricultural activity consists predominantly of dairy farming and cattle breeding in the mountainous areas. In the plains fruit and wine production are important, but there is also mixed farming.

Industries of the canton include optical goods, pyrotechnics, chemicals and pharmaceuticals. Tourism plays an important role in the many resorts. There is a thermal spa in Bad Ragaz and another in St. Margrethen and a great number of winter sports facilities.

Education
Higher educational institutions include the Hochschule für Technik Rapperswil and the University of St. Gallen.

Notes and references

External links

 Official website  stadt 
Restaurant st Gallen spitze 
 BusreszaurantsNSr Gallen

 
Cantons of Switzerland
Cantons of the Helvetic Republic
1803 establishments in Switzerland
States and territories established in 1803